Colonel Maurice Hussey (1644 – 1714) was an Irish Jacobite politician and soldier.

Hussey was the son of Walter Hussey and Katherine Fitzgerald. He was a Member of Parliament for Tralee in the short-lived Patriot Parliament called by James II of England in 1689. He was given a commission in Roger McElligott's Regiment of Foot, becoming lieutenant colonel of the regiment in 1690.

Following the Williamite War in Ireland, Hussey was granted a pardon under the Articles of Limerick. However, as a staunch Roman Catholic, he left Ireland in 1703 owing to the Penal Laws.

References

1644 births
1714 deaths
17th-century Irish people
Irish Jacobites
Irish MPs 1689
Irish soldiers in the army of James II of England
Members of the Parliament of Ireland (pre-1801) for County Kerry constituencies
People from County Kerry